King Cheng of Zhou, personal name Ji Song (姬誦), was the second king of the Chinese Zhou dynasty. The dates of his reign are 1042–1021 BCE or 1042/35–1006 BCE. His parents were King Wu of Zhou and Queen Yi Jiang (邑姜).

King Cheng was young when he ascended the throne. His uncle, Duke of Zhou, fearing that Shang forces might rise again under the possible weak rule of a young ruler, became the regent and supervised government affairs for several years. Duke of Zhou established the eastern capital at Luoyang, and later defeated a rebellion by Cheng's uncles Cai Shu, Guan Shu and Huo Shu.

King Cheng later stabilized the Zhou dynasty's border by defeating several barbarian tribes along with the Duke of Zhou.

Family
Queens:
 Wang Si, of the Si clan, the mother of Crown Prince Zhao

Sons:
 Crown Prince Zhao (1040–996 BC), ruled as King Kang of Zhou from 1020 to 996 BC

Ancestry

See also
 Family tree of ancient Chinese emperors

References

Year of birth unknown
11th-century BC deaths
Zhou dynasty kings
11th-century BC Chinese monarchs